Eversmile, New Jersey is a 1989 Argentine-British comedy-drama film directed by Carlos Sorín and starring Daniel Day-Lewis, Mirjana Joković and Gabriela Acher. It was written by Sorín, Jorge Goldenberg and Roberto Scheuer. It premiered on September 11, 1989 at the Toronto Festival of Festivals in Canada.

Plot summary
Fergus O'Connell, an itinerant Irish American dentist from New Jersey, offers his services free-of-charge to the isolated rural population of Patagonia, in Argentina. He's able to do so because of the supposedly no-strings sponsorship of a "dental consciousness" foundation. While his motorbike is being repaired, O'Connell meets Estela, the garage-owner's daughter, and they quickly become affectionate towards each other. Both lovers have prior commitment: he is married, and she is engaged. Yet, they go off together all the same. After a series of surrealistic adventures, O'Connell discovers that there's a subliminal price tag attached to his altruistic free services. Nevertheless, Fergus decides to continue with his work on the prevention of tooth decay and dental health education, simultaneously freeing himself from any kind of sponsorship and corporate meddling. He again proposes Estela to come join him, and they both depart, traveling on the road once again.

Cast
 Daniel Day-Lewis as Dr. Fergus O'Connell
 Mirjana Joković as Estela
 Gabriela Acher as Celeste
 Julio De Grazia as Dr. Ulises Calvo
 Ignacio Quirós as The 'Boss'
 Boy Olmi as Radio Announcer
 Eduardo D'Angelo as Manager
 Alberto Benegas as Sheriff
 Roberto Catarineu as López
 Miguel Dedovich as Brother Conrad
 Miguel Ligero as Brother Felix
 José María Rivara as Gangster
 Vando Villamil as Gangster
 Alejandro Escudero as Brother Segundo
 Rubén Patagonia as Butler

Awards
Wins
 Donostia-San Sebastián International Film Festival: Prize San Sebastián; Best Actress, Mirjana Jokovic; 1989.

References

External links
 
 
 

1989 films
Films about dentistry
1980s romantic comedy-drama films
Argentine romantic comedy-drama films
British romantic comedy-drama films
Films set in Argentina
Films directed by Carlos Sorín
1989 comedy films
1989 crime drama films
1980s English-language films
1980s British films